KQRC-FM (98.9 MHz, "98-9 The Rock") is a radio station licensed to Leavenworth, Kansas and serving the Kansas City metropolitan area. Its studios are located in Mission, Kansas, and the transmitter site is in South Kansas City. The station is owned by Audacy, Inc.

History

1962-1979: KCLO-FM 
The 98.9 MHz frequency shuffled between formats when it first went on the air in 1962. Licensed to Leavenworth, the station began as KCLO-FM, a religious/MOR outlet simulcasting with its AM sister station on 1410.

1979-1982: KTRO 
In 1979, it became a country station as KTRO.

1982-1986: KZZC 
In December 1982, KTRO became "ZZ 99", KZZC. They competed heavily against the city's already existing Top 40 outlet KBEQ-FM by emphasizing on newer music in comparison to KBEQ's oldies lean. The station also was home to Kansas City legendary DJ Randy Miller in morning drive. On August 25, 1986, due to financial trouble, the station flipped to a syndicated oldies outlet as "98.9 Gold" with the KZZC call letters still in place.

1987-1989: KCWV 
On September 24, 1987, at Noon, "98.9 The Wave" debuted with a new age (a precursor to the smooth jazz format) and easy listening format, competing with a multitude of AC stations. The call letters were also changed to KCWV. In May 1989, Wodlinger Broadcasting sold the station to Journal Broadcast Group for $6 million.

1989-1992: KRVK 
On October 27, 1989, at 5:37 p.m., the station flipped to soft rock as KRVK, "98.9 The River". The station was largely automated with very low-key on-air personalities.

1992-present: KQRC 
On April 3, 1992, at 5 p.m., after playing "The River" by Garth Brooks, KRVK flipped to "98.9 The Rock", which debuted with Kansas City band Shooting Star's "Hang On For Your Life". The Rock has lived up to its name in the stability of its format, surviving a rock format shuffle in 1997 that claimed Kansas City's (then) longest-surviving (23 years) FM rock station, KYYS.

Journal sold KQRC to Sinclair Broadcast Group in 1997, with Entercom buying the station in 2000.

Programming
98.9 The Rock broadcasts a Mainstream Rock format consisting of Hard rock and Heavy metal acts. They tend to play heavier rock than modern rock/alternative rock sister station KRBZ with such artists as Disturbed, Godsmack, Staind and Shinedown mixed with older rock acts like Black Sabbath, Guns N' Roses, AC/DC, Def Leppard and Van Halen. Metallica is frequently played, including a featured "Mandatory Metallica" with three consecutive songs by the band aired nightly.  The station's morning show, hosted by shock jock Johnny Dare, is regularly ranked atop the local Arbitron ratings. The Rock airs two nationally syndicated shows on Sundays—The House of Hair with Dee Snider, and the rock news show HardDrive with Lou Brutus.

On September 26, 2010, KQRC was the first FM radio station in the country to release an app for the iOS operating system (Apple mobile devices) that offered an events list with Google Mapping, and push messaging.

Rockfest
For many years, KQRC hosted Rockfest, the largest single-day music festival in North America. Past headliners include Disturbed, Godsmack, Staind, Seether, Stone Temple Pilots, and Korn.

References

External links

FREE JOHHNNY DARE (The Johnny Dare Morning Show Website)
Rockfest Website

QRC-FM
QRC
Leavenworth County, Kansas
Active rock radio stations in the United States
Audacy, Inc. radio stations